History Civil War: Secret Missions is a historical first-person shooter video game developed by Cauldron Ltd, and released on 4 November 2008 by Activision Value and the History Channel for Microsoft Windows, PlayStation 2, PlayStation 3 and Xbox 360.  It is a sequel to The History Channel: Civil War – A Nation Divided.

Overview
In History Civil War: Secret Missions, the player assumes the role of both Union and Confederate soldiers fighting behind enemy lines in legendary battles that took place during the American Civil War.

The player's goal is to disrupt the armies of both the North and South by any means necessary, including stopping enemy supply lines, stealing ironclad ships and sabotaging enemy strongholds. Engaging in some of the Civil War's most famous battles, such as The Great Train Raid of 1861 and the fall of Vicksburg in utilizing classic weapons of the era, including the pepperbox revolver and the coffee mill gun.

All missions are based on the actions of famous partisans, scouts and rangers – fighting as a member of Mosby's Rangers, Sheridan's Scouts and Grant's Secret Service and receiving mission commands from famous generals like Robert E. Lee, "Stonewall" Jackson, and Ulysses S. Grant.

Gameplay
This game takes the player through secret missions that took place on both sides of the war. The player has to battle enemy forces and protect his fellow soldiers. Melee is a large part of the game, as it was in the prequel. Reload times vary from weapon to weapon, with muskets taking a long time to reload, and repeating rifles taking a relatively short time.

Missions include being a part of a secret sniper mission at the Battle of Gettysburg, conducting a covert train raid on the B&O Railroad, sabotage artillery outposts during the Battle of Lewisburg, etc. Players get to use a variety of weaponry from the era - such as repeating rifles, grenades, sabers, artillery, and shotguns.

The game features intense, tactical combat. It is based on authentic Civil War combat methods, artillery barrages, urban assaults, sniping, and stealth. Set charges, place explosives, sabotage enemy strongholds, and destroy enemy buildings to complete objectives.

Each level begins with a short History Chanel documentary video, which describes the historical events depicted and their significance in the Civil War. Players encounter bonus objectives from mission to mission such as saving P.O.W.s and destroying crates. Players can ignore or accept these bonus objectives.

Reception

The game received mediocre ratings from critics. IGN praised the graphics but panned the length of the game. GameRankings criticizes the small glitches, but praised the game in portraying "something to skip WWII shooters".

Many critics did however noted the game to be one of the best of its genre. GameFaqs described it as currently the best first person Civil War shooter in its "Top 10 American Civil War Games".

References

External links
Cauldron

2008 video games
American Civil War video games
Video games developed in Slovakia
First-person shooters
North America-exclusive video games
PlayStation 2 games
PlayStation 3 games
Windows games
Xbox 360 games
Stealth video games
Activision games
Video games using Havok
Single-player video games